Willis Vaughton (20 January 1911 – 17 December 2007) was a professional footballer who played for Huddersfield Town, Sheffield United, Boston United and New Brighton. He was born and died in Sheffield.

References

1911 births
2007 deaths
English footballers
Footballers from Sheffield
Association football defenders
English Football League players
Huddersfield Town A.F.C. players
Sheffield United F.C. players
Boston United F.C. players
New Brighton A.F.C. players